was a Japanese swimmer who specialized in the 200 m breaststroke. In this event he won a silver medal at the 1932 Olympics and a bronze medal at the 1936 Olympics, and set an unofficial world record in 100 m between these Olympics. During his career Koike won eight national titles.

After the end of World War II, Koike became a coach for the Japanese national Olympic swimming team and chairman of the Japan Swimming Federation. He was present in Barcelona during the 1992 Summer Olympics, when Kyoko Iwasaki won the gold medal. In 1990 Koike received the Olympic Order in Silver, and in 1996 was inducted into the International Swimming Hall of Fame. He died of lung cancer in 1998.

See also
 List of members of the International Swimming Hall of Fame

References

1915 births
1998 deaths
Olympic swimmers of Japan
Olympic silver medalists for Japan
Olympic bronze medalists for Japan
Swimmers at the 1932 Summer Olympics
Swimmers at the 1936 Summer Olympics
Japanese male breaststroke swimmers
People from Numazu, Shizuoka
Deaths from lung cancer
Olympic bronze medalists in swimming
Recipients of the Olympic Order
Medalists at the 1936 Summer Olympics
Medalists at the 1932 Summer Olympics
Olympic silver medalists in swimming
20th-century Japanese people